The Never Ending Tour is the popular name for Bob Dylan's endless touring schedule since June 7, 1988.

Background information
The Never Ending Tour 1999 started in Fort Myers, Florida. This was the first time that Dylan had performed in Florida since 1995. The rest of the tour focused mainly the eastern United States except the final two concerts of the tour which took place in Paradise, Nevada.

Dylan travelled to Europe after finishing the North American leg. Dylan started the tour with two concerts in Portugal followed by eleven concerts in Spain. Dylan also performed three concerts in Austria.

After completing the European summer tour Dylan returned to the United States to perform a thirty-eight date tour with Paul Simon. During the tour he performed as part of the Summerfest summer festival in Milwaukee, Wisconsin and also performed a show without Paul Simon at the Tramps Nightclub. The first leg of this two-part tour came to a close in Wantagh, New York on July 31. The tour picked up again at West Palm Beach, Florida on September 2 and travelled throughout the southern states coming to a close on September 18 in Dallas, Texas.

On October 26 Dylan started a twenty date tour with Phil Lesh and Friends. The tour came to a close in Newark, Delaware on November 20.

Tour dates

Notes

References

External links

BobLinks – Comprehensive log of concerts and set lists
Bjorner's Still on the Road – Information on recording sessions and performances

Bob Dylan concert tours
1999 concert tours